Obrazovanshchina ('educationdom', 'educaties', 'smatterers') is a Russian ironical, derogatory term for a category of people with superficial education who lack the higher ethics of an educated person.

The term was introduced by Alexander Solzhenitsyn in his 1974 essay "Obrazovanshchina" (translated as "The Smatterers") as a criticism of the transformation of the Russian intelligentsia, which, in his opinion had lost high ethical values.

Wykształciuchy is a similar term used in Poland, a country that shares the concept of 'intelligentsia' with Russia.

Solzhenitsyn defines obrazovanshchina as the category of people who refer to themselves as "intelligentsia" solely on the basis of having a higher than middle education.

A similar criticism of Russian intelligentsia came from Nikolai Berdyaev, who coined the ironic word intelligentshchina for the part of intelligentia locked in their own world, isolated from the rest of the Russian society.

See also
Atel (slang)
Egghead, a derogatory term criticizing other aspects of educated people
Wykształciuch, Polish wiki

References

Social groups
Society of Russia
Social class in Poland
Russian words and phrases
Pejorative terms for people
Works by Aleksandr Solzhenitsyn
Quotations from literature
1974 neologisms